Allerbach is the name of several rivers and streams in Germany:

 Allerbach (Bewer), tributary of the Bewer, near Deitersen, county of Northeim, Lower Saxony
 Allerbach (Bruchbach), tributary of the Bruchbach, near Hustedt, county of Celle, Lower Saxony
 Allerbach (Rappbode), tributary of the Rappbode (Rappbode Dam), near Trautenstein, county of Harz, Saxony-Anhalt
 Allerbach (Violenbach), tributary of the Violenbach, near Gerden, county of Osnabrück, Lower Saxony
 Allerbach (Warme Bode), tributary of the Warme Bode, near Tanne, county of Harz, Saxony-Anhalt
 Allerbach, alternative name for the Todbach, tributary of the Blies in St. Wendel, county of St. Wendel, Saarland
 Allerbach, alternative name for the Wallesbach, headstream of the Todbach in Hirstein and Namborn, county of St. Wendel, Saarland

See also
 Aller (disambiguation)